The Christian Brethren are a denomination of Protestant Christianity in Egypt. They are related to the Exclusive Brethren tradition, even though the Christian Brethren label is internationally used more often by Open rather than Exclusive Brethren.

The Evangelical publication Operation World estimates that the Christian Brethren in Egypt had 27,500 adults and children attending 283 assemblies as of 2010.

References

See also 
Christianity in Egypt
Religion in Egypt

Christian denominations in Africa
Plymouth Brethren
Protestantism in Egypt